The Cyprus Memorial Forest, a.k.a. Cyprus Memorial Cemetery, is a memorial forest including a symbolic military cemetery and an open-air museum dedicated to the Turkish servicemen killed in action during the 1974 Turkish military invasion of Cyprus. Established in 1976, it is located at Silifke district of Mersin Province in southern Turkey.

Following the 1974 Cypriot coup d'état, Turkey, under the guise of fearing an intercommunal  fighting and killing, intervened .

In 1976, a symbolic cemetery was established in commemoration of 454 Turkish army servicemen. A tree was planted next to each symbolic grave. A monument of Atatürk is erected in the middle of s ceremonial square surrounded by the symbolic graves. Another monument is dedicated to the fallen 220 warriors of the Turkish-Cypriot resistance. There is also a museum at the military memorial, in which weapons like rifles, pistols and ammunition are exhibited. Some heavy military equipment, such as a tank, a howitzer and an armoured personnel carrier, which were captured from the Greek-Cypriot Army, are on display in the open-air museum. The military memorial, which was initially administrated by the National Parks Authority, was later handed over to the Regional Forest Directoriate due to its nature of a forest.

By the summer of 2014, the Regional Forest Directoriate sent the museum's display items to the Mersin Naval Museum on grounds that they are not capable of their maintenance. In December, 2014, the heavy military equipment were transferred to the newly established Mersin Peace Museum, an action, which was highly protested by the local residents. Couple of days later, the open-air museum's articles were returned to the military memorial.

The memorial cemetery hosts an official ceremony every year.

References

External links
 Images at wowturkey.com

1976 establishments in Turkey
Turkish military memorials and cemeteries
Buildings and structures in Mersin Province
Silifke District
Tourist attractions in Mersin Province
Cenotaphs in Turkey
Open-air museums in Turkey
Forests of Turkey
Museums in Mersin Province